List of Dynasty characters may refer to:

 List of Dynasty (1981 TV series) characters
 List of Dynasty (2017 TV series) characters